Shabalin is a Russian masculine surname, its feminine counterpart is Shabalina. Notable people with the surname include:

 Maxim Shabalin (born 1982), Russian ice dancer
 Pavel Shabalin (born 1988), Kazakhstani footballer 
 Sergey Shabalin (born 1971), Kazakhstani fencer
Valeriia Shabalina (born 1995), Russian Paralympic swimmer

Russian-language surnames